Nikolay Khozyainov (born 17 July 1992) is a Russian classical pianist. He is noted for what music critic Anthony Tommasini describes as "stunning virtuosity".

Youth and education
Nikolay Khozyainov was born in Blagoveshchensk on 17 July 1992. He began to play the piano at the age of five and continued his studies in Moscow at the Central Musical School by the Moscow Conservatory. At the age of seven he made his debut with the Handel Piano Concerto at the Great Hall of the Moscow Conservatory. At the present time he is pursuing an Advanced Degree at the Hannover Hochschule fur Musik under the guidance of Professor Arie Vardi.

Performances 
Highlights of Nikolay Khozyainov's recital and concerto engagements include concerts at Carnegie Hall, London's Wigmore Hall, Lincoln Center, Kennedy Center in Washington, Salle Gaveau, Theatre de Champs-Élysées in Paris, Tchaikovsky Hall in Moscow, Tokyo's Suntory Hall, Louvre, Zurich Tonhalle.

In January 2018, the Emperor Akihito and Empress Michiko of Japan came to Nikolay's concert in Tokyo's Suntory Hall.

He has performed with the Philharmonia Orchestra, Tokyo Symphony Orchestra, Sydney Symphony Orchestra, Warsaw Philharmonic Orchestra, Czech National Symphony Orchestra, Russian State Orchestra, The Yomiuri Nippon Symphony Orchestra, RTE National Symphony Orchetra of Ireland and other.

Discography

Achievements and awards
His growing list of awards and achievements includes:
Finalist of the XVI International Chopin Piano Competition in Warsaw, Poland
1st prize at 2003 Virtuosi per musica di pianoforte in Czech Republic 
1st prize at the IX International Carl Filtsch Piano Competition in Romania
2nd prize at the VI Moscow International Frederic Chopin Piano Competition for young pianists
1st  prize at the 2012 Dublin International Piano Competition
2nd prize at the 2012 Sydney International Piano Competition
Special Prizes for:
Audience Prize
Best Performance of Both Concertos Voted by Members of the Sydney Symphony Orchestra
Best Performance of a Work by Liszt
Best Performance of a Work by Schubert
Best Performance of a Virtuoso Study
Youngest Finalist

References

Living people
Russian classical pianists
Male classical pianists
1992 births
21st-century classical pianists
21st-century Russian male musicians